Reese House is a historic home located at Hendersonville, Henderson County, North Carolina. It was built about 1885, and is a two-story, "T"-shaped Queen Anne style frame dwelling.  It is sheathed in weatherboard and has a one-story rear ell.  It features a single projecting bay and an ornate wraparound porch.

It was listed on the National Register of Historic Places in 1995.

References

Houses on the National Register of Historic Places in North Carolina
Queen Anne architecture in North Carolina
Houses completed in 1885
Houses in Henderson County, North Carolina
National Register of Historic Places in Henderson County, North Carolina
Hendersonville, North Carolina